Nong Khaem is a sub-district in the Phrom Phiram District of Phitsanulok Province, Thailand.

Geography
Nong Khaem lies in the Nan Basin, which is part of the Chao Phraya Watershed.

Administration
The following is a list of the sub-district's muban, which roughly correspond to its villages:

References

Tambon of Phitsanulok province
Populated places in Phitsanulok province